Il Volo (Italian for "The Flight") is an Italian operatic pop trio, consisting of baritone Gianluca Ginoble, and tenors Piero Barone and Ignazio Boschetto. They describe their music as "popera". Having won the Sanremo Music Festival 2015, they represented Italy in the Eurovision Song Contest 2015 in Vienna, Austria. They reached third place, but achieved first-place in the televoting.

History

Beginning (Ti lascio una canzone) (2009–10)
In 2009, Piero Barone, Ignazio Boschetto and Gianluca Ginoble were among the teens competing in the Italian televised singing competition Ti lascio una canzone, held at the Teatro Ariston in Sanremo and broadcast by Rai 1. During the first episodes, they performed several songs as solo artists. Among the others, Gianluca Ginoble's rendition of "Il mare calmo della sera", originally by Andrea Bocelli, won the first episode of the show, and later came in first place during the final held on 2 May 2009. 
Director and creator of the show, Roberto Cenci, had the idea to put them together, with the purpose to create a trio similar to The Three Tenors (Plácido Domingo, José Carreras and Luciano Pavarotti). During the fourth episode of the show, they performed together for the first time, singing Neapolitan classic song "’O sole mio".
While in Los Angeles, Italian singer-songwriter and music producer Tony Renis casually discovered their performance through Rai International. 
Impressed by the trio, he decided to call Cenci to arrange a meeting with them. Since they were under the age of 18, Cenci talked with the singers' families, and they decided to trust Renis' proposal to work with him.
Thanks to lawyer Peter Lopez, Renis met with Geffen Records' Jimmy Iovine and Ron Fair and they offered a recording deal to the group, which allowed them to become the first Italian artists to directly sign with an American recording label. Producer Michele Torpedine started to work with them as a manager.

The group was initially named "I Tre Tenorini", but their name was later changed to "The Tryo". With this name, in 2010 the group participated in the charity single "We Are the World 25 for Haiti", a remake of the 1985 hit song "We Are the World".
In February of the same year, they also performed the songs "Granada" and "Un amore così grande" for Queen Rania of Jordan during the 60th Sanremo Music Festival. In late 2010, their name was finally changed into "Il Volo" (English: the flight)

Il Volo (2010–12) 
In 2010, Il Volo started working on their first studio album, which was recorded in the Abbey Road Studios in London and produced by Tony Renis and Humberto Gatica. 
Simply titled Il Volo, the album is mainly composed of covers of international and Italian standards, including "Il mondo", "Un amore così grande", "’O sole mio", "El reloj" and Charlie Chaplin's "Smile", but also features original songs written by Diane Warren and Walter Afanasieff.
Released in Italy on 30 November 2010, it peaked at number 6 on the Italian Albums Chart, and was later certified platinum by the Federation of the Italian Music Industry.

The international edition of the album was released in the United States by Geffen Records on 12 April 2011, and was promoted with a performance during the final three results show of American Idol'''s tenth season, as well as with appearances on The Tonight Show, Good Morning America, The Ellen DeGeneres Show and The Early Show.
 The lead single from the album in the United States was "’O sole mio".
During its first week, Il Volo reached the tenth spot of Billboard 200 and topped the Classical Albums chart, with sales of 23,000 copies. The album also entered the top ten in other countries, including Belgium, France, Germany, New Zealand and the Netherlands, and it peaked at number one on the Ö3 Austria Albums Chart.

In June 2011, a Spanish version of the album was released, with the title Il Volo (Edición en Español). The record achieved commercial success in Mexico, peaking at number six and being certified platinum by the Asociación Mexicana de Productores de Fonogramas y Videogramas, as well as in the United States, where it topped the Billboard Latin Pop Albums chart and it received the RIAA Latin gold certification, denoting shipments in excess of 50,000 units in the country. 
This also allowed the group to receive two nominations at the 12th Latin Grammy Awards, in the categories Best New Artist and Best Pop Album by a Duo or Group with Vocals, for the album Il Volo (Edición en Español).

The trio performed for the TV show The Talk in February 2011 and on 13 October 2011. On 31 July 2011, the trio performed "’O sole mio" and "This Time" for the President's Star Charity show in Singapore to help raise funds for the handicapped. 
On 4 September 2011, the trio performed "’O sole mio" and "Smile" for the MDA Labor Day Telethon. On 11 September 2011, the trio made a cameo appearance on the series finale of Entourage.

On 27 October 2011, Il Volo performed live at the Detroit Opera House to tape their first concert DVD titled Il Volo – Takes Flight – Live from the Detroit Opera House.  This concert premiered on 7 December 2011, in Detroit (on PBS Channel WTVS) and 1,000 cities across Canada (that receive Detroit's PBS on their cable system). On 21 November 2011, Il Volo released, only in digital format, their first EP called Christmas Favourites, which contains a duet with Pia Toscano. On the same date, their début album was re-released in a special edition that also includes the tracks from Christmas Favourites. On 22 December 2011, Il Volo was the closing guest for The Tonight Show with Jay Leno, singing "The Christmas Song".

On 28 February 2012, Il Volo's new CD and DVD, Il Volo – Takes Flight – Live from the Detroit Opera House, was released. This concert was shown on PBS stations across the US and Canada followed by a tour of the countries from August through October. In October and early November 2012 Il Volo performed in concert with Barbra Streisand. They sang with her the song "Smile", and "Make My Garden Grow", and performed singles "O Sole Mio" and "Un Amore Cosi Grande".

 We Are Love (2012–13) 
On 19 November 2012 Il Volo released their second album, We Are Love (Billboard 200 number 100), which include 12 tracks in three different languages (Italian, English and Spanish) and duets with Plácido Domingo and with Italian pop singer Eros Ramazzotti. The album contains eight unreleased songs, written by Diane Warren, Luis Bacalov and Latin Grammy winner Edgar Cortazar among others, and four covers. It also includes the theme song of film Hidden Moon, "Luna Nascosta", that Il Volo recorded in 2012. "Luna Nascosta" was selected by the Academy among the seventy-five songs in the running for nominations in the Original Song category for the 2013 Oscars.

On 28 November 2012 Il Volo performed at the 80th annual Christmas at Rockefeller Center tree lighting in New York, which was broadcast live nationwide on NBC, and on 11 December  they performed at the 2012 Nobel Peace Prize Concert in Oslo, Norway, with King Harald V in attendance, singing "Il Mondo" and album title track "We Are Love".

On 9 April 2013 they released a Spanish version of We Are Love, titled Más Que Amor, which includes an additional duet with Mexican singer Belinda. The album débuted at number 1 on the Billboard Latin Pop Albums and peaked at number 2 on the Billboard Top Latin Albums. Más Que Amor was certified Gold in Mexico and Argentina.

On 25 April 2013, they performed the song "El Triste" at the 2013 Latin Billboard Music Awards as a tribute to singer José José.

On 16 June Il Volo performed "Más Que Amor" during the "In Memoriam" tribute of the 40th Daytime Emmy Awards.
On 11 July 2013 they sang the national anthem of United States before the game between the Colorado Rockies and the Los Angeles Dodgers at Dodger Stadium in Los Angeles.

 Buon Natale – The Christmas Album (2013–14) 
On 26 October 2013, they released the international version of Buon Natale: The Christmas Album, which includes some of the most popular American Christmas songs, as well as two songs in Latin, one in Spanish and one in German, and duets with Pia Toscano and Belinda. The album debuted at number 1 on the Billboard Holiday Albums and peaked at number 1 on the Billboard Classical Albums chart. The single "O Holy Night" peaked at number 27 on the Billboard Adult Contemporary chart. In November, a special Italian edition was released, including songs "Bianco Natale" and "Astro del ciel". Rolling Stone published on its website a cappella performances of three tracks, "O Holy Night", "White Christmas" and "Santa Claus is Coming to Town".

In February 2014, the trio received two nominations at the 2014 Latin Billboard Music Awards, as Top Latin Albums Artist of the Year, Duo or Group and Latin Pop Albums Artist of the Year, Duo or Group.
The awards show took place at the BankUnited Center of Miami on 24 April, and broadcast live by Telemundo.
During the evening Il Volo is awarded as Best Group of the year in Latin Pop Albums category and won El Pulso Social award, as artist who has dominated interactions on social networking sites during the Billboard Awards.
The group also presented the Latin Pop Songs artist of the Year, Duo or Group award.

During 2014 the group focused on the preparation of a new album (Musica Che Resta is the current one in 2020), set to be released in 2015.
In June they returned to North America for a series of 15 concerts in United States and Canada, accompanied by a band and an orchestra. 
The set list traced their career, including the most successful songs of their repertoire, and the tour gets very positive reviews from critics.
In July and September they toured in Italy for first time.

On 21 August 2014, Il Volo are awarded as Dúo or Grupo Favorito in the Premios Tu Mundo. The awards celebrates the Latin pop culture in the United States and are broadcast live by Telemundo.

On 14 December 2014, is announced their participation in the 2015 Sanremo Music Festival (10–14 February 2015), performing the unreleased song Grande amore. On 21 December 2014, they performed at the traditional Christmas Concert in the Italian Senate, in front of the highest offices of state, accompanied by a choir of children with hearing disabilities who perform the songs with sign language. At the end of the concert, the President of the Republic Giorgio Napolitano and the President of Senate Pietro Grasso  praised the group.

 Sanremo grande amore, Eurovision Song Contest, and Notte Magica (2015–2018) 

On 14 February 2015, they took part in the Sanremo Music Festival 2015, winning 39.05% of the total vote over the 2 leading challengers. The win gave the group the opportunity to represent  at the Eurovision Song Contest 2015. As  is a member of the Big Five, the group went straight in to the Grand Final of the Eurovision Song Contest, held in Vienna on 23 May 2015. Grande Amore came 3rd with 292 points -winning the televote with 366 points- and won the Marcel Bezençon Press Award, as best song according to the collective voting of the accredited press. The extended play Sanremo grande amore was released in Italy on 20 February 2015 and was certified triple platinum by FIMI.

Their fourth studio album was released worldwide on 25 September 2015 by Sony Music Latin, in three different versions: an International version and a Spanish version for the Latin market titled Grande Amore and an Italian version titled L'amore si muove. The album is composed of original songs and covers of international and Italian standards and it was produced by Emilio Estefan, Celso Valli, Cheche Alara and Michele Torpedine. It peaked at number 1 in Italy and on the Billboard Top Classical Albums and on the Billboard Latin Pop Albums chart. It was certified double platinum for more than 100,000 copies sold by FIMI.

Il Volo was part of the 2015 Columbus Day Parade in New York City.

On 30 September 2016, the group together with Placido Domingo released Notte Magica - A Tribute to the Three Tenors. The live album features many of the songs performed by The Three Tenors (Domingo, Pavarotti and Carreras) for their iconic concert held on the eve of the Italia '90 World Cup.

On 4 March 2017 they debuted at the Radio City Music Hall in New York "Notte Magica – A Tribute to the Three Tenors" that will tour in the most important cities of the United States of America, in Italy, Europe and Latin America.

The first date was held in Firenze their concert at the Baths of Caracalla, materialized in an album and a world tour that debuted on 1 July in Piazza Santa Croce in Florence.

 69th Sanremo Festival, Musica, and The Best of 10 Years (2019-present) 
In 2019, they took part in the 69th Sanremo Festival with the song "Musica che resta". The piece, written and composed by Gianna Nannini, Emilio Munda, Piero Romitelli, Pasquale Mammaro and Antonello Carozza, ranking in third place. On February 22, 2019, Il Volo released their fifth studio album, Musica, worldwide. Later that year on November 8, they released their compilation album, Il Volo: The Best of 10 Years, to celebrate their tenth anniversary of their career. The group has also embarked on a world tour, which kicked off in May 2019 in Japan, continued in Latin America beginning on October 3, and arrived in North America the next year on January 28, 2020.

On June 5, 2021, they held a concert in the Arena of Verona in honor of the Italian composer Ennio Morricone. In November 2021, they released a tribute album dedicated to Maestro Morricone titled Il Volo Sings Morricone.

Members

 Piero Barone (born 24 June 1993 in Naro, Agrigento, Sicily)  is a Spinto tenor demonstrating a range from G#2-B4. He has a dramatic sound while still easily reaching higher notes.
 Ignazio Boschetto (born 4 October 1994 in Bologna, Emilia-Romagna, to Sicilian parents from Marsala and Petrosino)Ignazio Boschetto biography is a lyric tenor with a clear and bright timbre. He has demonstrated a range from G#2-D5. He has also sung up to F6 in falsetto.
 Gianluca Ginoble (born 11 February 1995 in Roseto degli Abruzzi, Abruzzo under the full name of Gianluce Ginoble Di Vittorio) is a lyric baritone with a range from E2-A4. He has a warm timbre, very easily singing at the top of the baritone range, while also being able to sing very low notes.

 Discography 

 Il Volo (2010)
 We Are Love (2012)
 Buon Natale: The Christmas Album (2013)
 Grande Amore // Grande Amore International Version // L'amore Si Muove (2015)
 10 years: The Best Of
 Ámame (Sony Masterworks, 2018)
 Musica (Sony Masterworks, 2019)Il Volo Sings Morricone (Sony Masterworks, 2021)

 Tours 
 2011 – Il Volo North American Tour 2011 2011 – Il Volo European Tour 2011 2012 – Il Volo South American Tour 2012 2012 – Il Volo Takes Flight Tour 2012 – Barbra Live – Special guests Chris Botti and Il Volo 2013 – We Are Love Tour 2013 – Más que amor Tour 2014 – US & Canada Summer Tour 2014 2016 – Grande amore Tour 2016 – L'amore si muove Tour 2017 – Notte magica Tour 2019 – Musica Tour 2020 – The Best of Ten Years TourAwards and nominations

Billboard Latin Music

|-
| style="text-align:center;" rowspan="2"| 2012
| Il Volo
| New Artist of the Year
| 
|-
|rowspan="4"| Il Volo| Latin Pop Albums Artist of the Year, Duo or Group
| 
|-
| style="text-align:center;"|2013
| Latin Pop Albums Artist of the Year, Duo or Group
| 
|-
| style="text-align:center;" rowspan="3"| 2014
| Top Latin Albums Artist of the Year, Duo or Group
| 
|-
| Latin Pop Albums Artist of the Year, Duo or Group
| 
|-
| Il Volo
| El Pulso Social
| 
|-

Latin Grammy

|-
| style="text-align:center;" rowspan="2"| 2011
| Il Volo
| Best New Artist
| 
|-
| Il Volo: Edición En Español| Best Pop Album By A Duo or Group with Vocal
| 
|-

Other

 Controversy 
On 29 September 2015, Italian media reported that Il Volo had trashed a room of the Hotel Garni du Lac, in Locarno, where they were staying. Apparently, the managers of the hotel had released some interviews to the German broadcast ZDF and later to the Italian media La Regione and Liberatv, complaining about the acts of vandalism the trio had put into place before leaving the premises. Allegedly, they stated that "objects, mattresses and laundry had been haphazardly thrown everywhere", and that "there was urine out of the toilet in the bathroom and the room walls had been smeared with fecal matter". Seemingly, the behaviour was to be explained with a sort of revenge for the room carpeting, which the trio was allergic to. Il Volo's press manager Danilo Ciotti commented the news immediately after stating that "it's true that they don't love carpeting because of allergies, but I don't believe they caused damages intentionally".
Subsequently, Barbara d'Urso arranged a live meeting during the Italian TV broadcast Pomeriggio 5'' between the director of the Hotel du Lac and Il Volo's press managers. The director denied all the statements attributed to him, clearly saying that all the story was fake news, resizing the events to some unmade beds and some depliants fallen from the desk in one of the rooms where the trio was staying.

See also 

 Luciano Pavarotti
 Gianluca Ginoble
 Ignazio Boschetto
 Piero Barone
 Il Divo
 Eurovision Song Contest
 Yo Soy (Latin American TV series)

References

External links 
 
 Official site
 II Volo at Sony Masterworks

Italian musical groups
Pop opera groups
Italian-language singers
Spanish-language singers of Italy
Latin pop music groups
Universal Music Group artists
Universal Music Latin Entertainment artists
English-language singers from Italy
Sony Music Latin artists
Sony Music Spain artists
Eurovision Song Contest entrants for Italy
Eurovision Song Contest entrants of 2015
Sanremo Music Festival winners